I Promise You Anarchy is a 2015 Mexican drama film, directed and written by Julio Hernández Cordón. The film stars Diego Calva Hernández and Eduardo Eliseo Martinez as two long-time friends and lovers, who after a failed business are separated by the mother of one of them.

The film premiered at the 68th Locarno International Film Festival, being the only Latin film competing for the Golden Leopard Award, and was screened at the Contemporary World Cinema Section of the 2015 Toronto International Film Festival. After its exhibition at the 13th Morelia International Film Festival, the film earned the Guerrero Award for Best Mexican Feature and a Special Mention by the Jury. The film also received two nominations at the 2016 Ariel Awards for Best Director and Best Cinematography.

Plot
The film begins with a love story between two people and ends by addressing the issue of illegal blood trafficking in Mexico, it is a story of crime and strong social criticism.

Cast
Diego Calva Hernández as Miguel
Eduardo Eliseo Martinez as Johnny
Shvasti Calderón as Adri
Oscar Mario Botello as David
Gabriel Casanova as Gabriel
Sarah Minter as Miguel's Mother
Martha Claudia Moreno as Johnny's Mother
Diego Escamilla Corona as Techno
Milkman as David
Erwin Jonathan Mora Alvarado as Príncipe Azteca
Juan Pablo Escalante as Nito
Daniel Adrián Mejía Aguirre as Hamster
Mario Alberto Sánchez as Major Tom
Yair Domínguez Monroy as Pedo Bomba
Francisco Kjeldson as Safari

Production
Diana Sánchez, artistic director of the Panama International Film Festival, stated that the film is "a lovely and heartfelt exploration of love and friendship. Beautifully shot, the film demonstrates Hernández’s versatility and progression as a filmmaker. The scenes of the skateboarders in Mexico City, for instance, are kinetic and feel very realistic”. According to the director, he tried to mix documentary, fiction and film noir, with the film showing "the innocence of youth and the moments you try to play the bad guy, the criminal, but you are not really that kind of character". Te Prometo Anarquía won one part of a split prize at the 2015 Panamá International Film Festival, where it received US$20,000 dollars to pay post production fees; the rest of the prize (US$5,000 dollars) was awarded to Costa Rica's El Sonido de las Cosas ("The Sound of Things"), directed by Ariel Escalante.

Reception
The film was named "The Best Mexican Film of 2015" by Fernanda Solórzano of Letras Libres.

Awards and nominations

References

External links
 

2015 films
2015 drama films
Mexican LGBT-related films
Mexican drama films
2010s Spanish-language films
LGBT-related drama films
2015 LGBT-related films
2010s Mexican films